Ruslan Tsarev (born 16 July 1991) is a Russian Greco-Roman wrestler from Kyrgyzstan. He competed at the 2016 Olympics, where he was eliminated in the round of 16 by Tarek Benaissa. At the Asian championships he won a gold, a silver and a bronze medal in 2014–2016.

In 2020, he won one of the bronze medals in the 72 kg event at the 2020 Individual Wrestling World Cup held in Belgrade, Serbia.

References

External links
 

1991 births
Living people
Kyrgyzstani male sport wrestlers
Olympic wrestlers of Kyrgyzstan
Wrestlers at the 2016 Summer Olympics
Wrestlers at the 2014 Asian Games
Asian Games competitors for Kyrgyzstan
Asian Wrestling Championships medalists
Islamic Solidarity Games medalists in wrestling
Islamic Solidarity Games competitors for Kyrgyzstan